Norborne Berkeley, 4th Baron Botetourt (c. 1717 – 15 October 1770), was a British courtier, member of parliament, and royal governor of the colony of Virginia from 1768 until his death in 1770.

Life
Norborne Berkeley was born about 1717, the only son of John Symes Berkeley of Stoke Gifford, Gloucestershire by his second wife Elizabeth, the daughter and coheiress of Walter Norborne of Calne, Wiltshire and the widow of Edward Devereux, 8th Viscount Hereford. The Berkeleys of Stoke Gifford were descended from Maurice de Berkeley (d. 1347), who had acquired the manor of Stoke Gifford in 1337, the second son of Maurice de Berkeley, 2nd Baron Berkeley (1271–1326). In 1726, Berkeley was admitted to Westminster School.

He succeeded his father to Stoke Park  in Stoke Gifford in 1736 and remodelled both the house (now known as the Dower House) and the gardens in the 1740s and 1750s with the help of the designer Thomas Wright of Durham.

He was appointed Colonel of the newly raised South Gloucestershire Militia and commanded it from 1758 to 1766.

His political career began in 1741 when he was elected to the House of Commons as a knight of the shire for Gloucestershire, a seat he held until 1763. Considered a staunch Tory, Berkeley's fortunes were boosted considerably on the accession of George III in 1760, when he was appointed a Groom of the Bedchamber and in 1762 (until 1766) Lord Lieutenant of Gloucestershire. In 1764, almost 400 years after the title went into abeyance through lack of direct heirs, he successfully claimed the title of Baron Botetourt as the lineal descendant of Maurice de Berkeley (d. 1361) and his wife Catherine de Botetourt. He thus took a seat in the House of Lords as the 4th Baron de Botetourt, and in 1767 was appointed a Lord of the Bedchamber to George III and in 1768 Governor of Virginia.

He died in Williamsburg on 15 October 1770, after an illness lasting several weeks. Botetourt never married and left no legitimate heirs. Stoke Park passed to his sister Elizabeth, who continued his improvements.

Statues
A statue of Botetourt was placed in the Capitol in Williamsburg in 1773. The Capital of Colonial Virginia was located in Williamsburg from 1699 until 1780, but at the urging of Governor Thomas Jefferson was moved to Richmond for security reasons during the American Revolution. In 1801 the statue of Botetourt was acquired by the College of William and Mary and moved to the campus from the former Capitol building. Barring a brief period during the Civil War when it was moved to the Public Asylum for safety, it stood in the College Yard until 1958 when it was removed for protection from the elements, and then in 1966 was installed in the new Earl Gregg Swem Library, in the new Botetourt Gallery. In 1993, as the College celebrated its tercentenary, a new bronze statue of Botetourt by William and Mary alumnus Gordon Kray was installed in the College Yard in front of the Wren Building, in the place occupied for generations by the original.

Legacy
Botetourt County, Virginia, was named in Botetourt's honour. Historians also believe that Berkeley County, West Virginia, and the town of Berkeley Springs, both now in West Virginia, were also named in his honour, or possibly that of another popular colonial governor, Sir William Berkeley.

Lord Botetourt High School in the unincorporated town of Daleville in Botetourt County, Virginia, is also named for him, as is the Botetourt Dorm Complex at The College of William and Mary. Two statues also adorn the campus of The College of William and Mary. Gloucester County, Virginia has an elementary school named for the governor.  Both Richmond, Virginia and Norfolk, Virginia have streets named in his honour.

References

External links
Taylor Stoermer's "Will the Real Lord Botetourt Please Stand?" in the Journal of the American Revolution
Norborne Berkeley at Encyclopedia Virginia

|-

1710s births
1770 deaths
04
Gloucestershire Militia officers
Colonial governors of Virginia
Lord-Lieutenants of Gloucestershire
Berkeley, Norborne
British MPs 1741–1747
British MPs 1747–1754
British MPs 1754–1761
British MPs 1761–1768
Year of birth uncertain
Norborne
Burials at the College of William & Mary